Goldspink is a surname. Notable people with the surname include:

Brett Goldspink (born 1971), Australian rugby league player
Darren Goldspink (born 1964), Australian rules football umpire
Kevin Goldspink (born 1941), Australian rugby league player
Sebastian Goldspink, curator of the 2022 Adelaide Biennial at the Art Gallery of South Australia

Surnames of Scottish origin